Roter See (bei Kakeldütt) is a lake in Mecklenburgische Seenplatte, Mecklenburgische Seenplatte, Mecklenburg-Vorpommern, Germany. At an elevation of 59.6 m, its surface area is 0.11 km².

Lakes of Mecklenburg-Western Pomerania